A culpascope or colposcope is effectively a flexible, free-standing binocular microscope, usually used in a Colposcopy examination. Forensically, it is typically used to examine, analyze, and photograph injuries in the genital region for victims or alleged victims of sexual abuse, sexual assault, or rape. It can facilitate treating victims under the difficult circumstances that surround the collection of concrete evidence of such crimes, by reducing the invasiveness of such procedures compared with other commonly used technology.

References

Microscopes
Forensic equipment